The Hafner–Sarnak–McCurley constant is a mathematical constant representing the probability that the determinants of two randomly chosen square integer matrices will be relatively prime.  The probability depends on the matrix size, n, in accordance with the formula 

where pk is the kth prime number. The constant is the limit of this expression as n approaches infinity. Its value is roughly 0.3532363719... .

References
.
.
.
.

External links
 

Mathematical constants
Infinite products